The Alfa Romeo 184T is a Formula One car which was used by the Alfa Romeo team during the  and  Formula One seasons. 

The car bore the colours of the team's major sponsor, Italian fashion company Benetton.

Design 

By 1984 however, the 890T had been left behind on power by its rivals, while the new fuel regulations limiting cars to only 220 litres per race.

Racing history

1984: 184T 
It achieved a total of 11 points, all in 1984. The car's best result was at the 1984 Italian Grand Prix, where Riccardo Patrese came 3rd, at teammate Eddie Cheever's expense as the American was running 3rd, but ran out of fuel. The new fuel regulations saw the Alfa's mostly uncompetitive in the races as the engine was notoriously hard on fuel consumption. Also, the lack of power saw both Patrese and Cheever having to push their 184T's harder just to try to keep in touch (more often than not this was a losing battle) and most of the 184T's retirements were due to the unreliability of the engine that the faster running produced, or the cars simply ran out of fuel.

1985: 184TB 

The 184TB model would become the last Alfa Romeo car to be raced in Formula One until the manufacturer's return to the sport with the C38 in 2019.

Complete Formula One results
(key)

References

184T
1984 Formula One season cars
1985 Formula One season cars